Erin is a hamlet and census-designated place in the town of Erin in Chemung County, New York, United States. The population of the CDP was 483 at the 2010 census, out of a total town population of 1,962.

Geography
Erin is located in northeastern Chemung County in the center of the town of Erin. It is in the valley of Newtown Creek, a west-flowing (and later south-flowing) tributary of the Chemung River, which in turn is a tributary of the Susquehanna River. Route 223 leads northeast  to NY-224 in the valley of Cayuta Creek, which then leads  farther east to Van Etten.

Demographics

References

Hamlets in New York (state)
Census-designated places in New York (state)
Census-designated places in Chemung County, New York
Hamlets in Chemung County, New York